SSLA may refer to:

 South Sudan Liberation Movement
 Society of Science, Letters and Art